Albert William Atwater (May 19, 1856 – November 2, 1929) was a Canadian politician.

Born in Montreal, the son of Albert William Atwater and Julia Eliza Brush, Atwater was educated at the Montreal High School and McGill University. He was called to the Quebec Bar in 1881 and was created a Queen's Counsel in 1889. A lawyer, he was a member of the Montreal City Council for Saint-Antoine from February to May 1896. He was elected with opposition to the Legislative Assembly of Quebec in an 1896 by-election for the riding of Montréal division no. 4. A Conservative, he was re-elected in 1897. From 1896 to 1897, he was the Treasurer of the Province of Quebec. He was defeated in 1900.

He was the grand-nephew of Edwin Atwater.

References
 

1856 births
1929 deaths
Anglophone Quebec people
Canadian King's Counsel
Conservative Party of Quebec MNAs
McGill University alumni
Montreal city councillors